The 1890 Prince Edward Island election was held on 10 August 1890 to elect members of the House of Assembly of the province of Prince Edward Island, Canada. This was the only election to produce a minority government for Prince Edward Island, until 2019. In many other elections such as 2019, a party won a majority of the seats without receiving a majority of the vote.

References
 

Elections in Prince Edward Island
1890 elections in Canada
1890 in Prince Edward Island
August 1890 events